Juste Chanlatte, Comte de Rosier (1766–1828) was a Haitian editor, journalist, poet, playwright and a count. He served as secretary to King Henri I of the Kingdom of Haiti with the noble title of Comte de Rosier. Chanlatte was born in Port-au-Prince and educated in France. He wrote for La Gazette du Cap and later was the editor of the official government publication under President Jean-Pierre Boyer, le Télégraphe.

Selected works 
 "Hayti reconnaissante" (1819)
 Ode à l'Indépendance (1821)
 Cantate à l'Indépendance (1821)
 La Triple Palme (1822)
 Le Naufrage de "l'Alexandre"

Sources

External links
 Juste Chanlatte in Haiti référence
 Link to archives of le Télégraphe

1766 births
1828 deaths
Haitian male poets
19th-century Haitian dramatists and playwrights
Haitian male dramatists and playwrights
People from Port-au-Prince
19th-century Haitian poets
19th-century male writers